Whimsical World Collection is Taiwanese Mandopop artist Rainie Yang's first collection album. It was released on 23 April 2010 by Sony Music Taiwan. It has two editions : the Deluxe Edition and the pre-order edition of 3 CDs and a DVD with 3 new tracks, 35 previously released tracks and 15 music videos from her five studio albums

Track listing

Disc 1
異想天開Yi Xiang Tian Kai (Whimsical)
偏食   Pian Shi (One-sided diet)
黑色月亮 Hei Se Yue Liang (Black Moon)
小茉莉 Xiao Mo Li (Little Jasmine)-theme song spider Lilies
摺疊式愛情 Zhe Die Shi Ai Qing (Foldable Love)
太煩惱 Tai Fan Nao (Too Much Trouble)-insert song of Miss No Good
只想愛你 Zhi Xiang Ai Ni (Just Wanna Love You)
In your eyes/ feat 羅志祥 Show Lo -insert song of Hi My Sweetheart 
理想情人 Li Xiang Qing Ren (Ideal Lover)-insert song Devil Beside You
不見 Bu Jian (Disappear)
甜心咒 Tian Xin Zhou (Sweet Curse)-feat Evan Yo
任意門 Ren Yi Men (Magic Door)
曖昧(日文版)

Disc 2
曖昧 Ai Mei (Ambiguous)-ending theme song Devil Beside You
可愛 Ke Ai (Cute)
單眼皮 Dan Yan Pi (Single Eyelid)
狼來了 Lang Lai Le (Wolf Coming)
青春鬥 Qing Chun Dou (Youth Bucket)-insert song of Hi My Sweetheart
倔強 Jue Qiang (Stubborn)
找不到 Zhao Bu Dao (Can't Find It)
過敏 Guo Min (Over-Sensitive)-Love gold oath advertisement song
我的愛吊點滴 Wo De Ai Diao Dian Di (My Love Drips and Drops)
絕對達令 Jue Dui Da Ling (Absolute Darling)
冷戰 Leng Zhan (Cold War)
你是壞人 Ni Shi Huai Ren (You Are A Bad Guy)
雨愛 Yu Ai (Rain Love)-ending theme song ofHi My Sweetheart

Disc 3
帶我走 Dai Wo Zou (Take Me Away)-ending theme song of Miss No Good
幸福節拍 Xing Fu De Jie Pai (Beat Of Happiness)-Darlie Toothpaste advertisement song
完美比例 Wan Mei Bi Li (Perfect Proportion)-insert song of Why Why Love
缺氧 Que Yang (Lacking Oxygen)-ending theme song of Why Why Love
匿名的好友 Ni Ming De Hao You (Anonymous Friend)-insert song of Hi My Sweetheartand theme song of Korean drama Brilliant Legacy
左邊 Zuo Bian (On The Left)
在你懷裡的微笑 Zai Ni Huai Li De Wei Xiao (In The Arms Of Your Smile)
學會 Xue Hui (Learned)
慶祝 Qing Zhu (Celebration)
下一次微笑 Xia Yi Ci Wei Xiao (Next Time Smiling)
遇上愛 Yu Shang Ai (Meeting Love)-CTV Telecomm advertisement song
恋の魔法

Ai Mei
My Intuition · 2005

Dai Wo Zou
Not Yet a Woman · 2008

Li Xiang Qing Ren
My Intuition · 2005

Goldfish With Amnesia
A Tale of Two Rainie · 2014

Nian Lun Shuo
Traces of Time in Love · 2016

Zhi Xiang Ai Ni
My Intuition · 2005

The Audience
Traces of Time in Love · 2016

Wei Ai Qi Cheng
Rainie Yang "Love Voyage" Concert Deluxe Edition · 2013

Ripples
A Tale of Two Rainie · 2014

Que Yang
My Other Self · 2007

Zuo Bian
Meeting Love · 2006

Qing Zhu
Meeting Love · 2006

External links
Whimsical World Collection, Deluxe Edition on LastFM

Rainie Yang albums
2010 compilation albums
Sony Music Taiwan albums

ja:日本語